Rotherham is a constituency represented in the House of Commons of the UK Parliament since 2012 by Sarah Champion, a member of the Labour Party.

History
This constituency was created in the Redistribution of Seats Act 1885.

Rotherham has consistently returned Labour MPs since a by-election in 1933, following the earlier period before 1923 dominated by the Liberal and Conservative parties. The numerical Labour majority in every general election from 1935 onwards has been in five figures, with the exceptions of 2015 and 2019.

Boundaries 

1918–1949: The County Borough of Rotherham, and the Urban Districts of Greasbrough and Rawmarsh.

1950–1983: The County Borough of Rotherham.

Rotherham constituency is one of three borough constituencies in the borough. The current boundary configuration was confirmed in 2005. It is formed with the Rotherham borough electoral wards:
Boston Castle, Brinsworth and Catcliffe, Keppel, Rotherham East, Rotherham West, Valley, and Wingfield in the Metropolitan Borough of Rotherham

It borders Rother Valley, Sheffield South East, Sheffield Brightside and Hillsborough, Penistone and Stocksbridge, and Wentworth and Dearne.

Constituency profile
The constituency consists of Census Output Areas of one local government district: a working population whose income is on average slightly below the national average and close to average reliance upon social housing.  At the end of 2012 the unemployment rate in the constituency stood at 7% and 9.6% male unemployment of the population claiming jobseekers allowance, compared to the regional average of 4.7%.  This was considerably higher also than the constituencies that share the borough.

The borough contributing to the seat has a relatively high 26.6% of its population without a car compared to 20.1% in Bassetlaw and 30.3% in Sheffield. In terms of extremes of education 29.8% of the population in 2011 were without qualifications, contrasted with 17.4% with level 4 qualifications or above.

In terms of tenure 65.2% of homes are owned outright or on a mortgage as at the 2011 census across the borough.  In the 10 years to the April 2011 Census the social rented sector saw a 4.9% reduction and the private rented sector a 5.3% increase; outright ownership saw a 3.8% increase.

Members of Parliament

Elections

Elections in the 2010s

Elections in the 2000s

Elections in the 1990s

Elections in the 1980s

Elections in the 1970s

Elections in the 1960s

Elections in the 1950s

Elections in the 1940s

Elections in the 1930s

Elections in the 1920s

Elections in the 1910s

Elections in the 1900s

Elections in the 1890s

 Caused by Acland's resignation.

 Caused by Acland's appointment as Vice President of the Committee of the Council on Education

Elections in the 1880s

See also 
 List of parliamentary constituencies in South Yorkshire

Notes

References

Sources
BBC News, Election 2005
BBC News, Vote 2001
Guardian Unlimited Politics
http://www.psr.keele.ac.uk/ (Election results from 1951 to the present)
F. W. S. Craig, British Parliamentary Election Results 1918 – 1949
F. W. S. Craig, British Parliamentary Election Results 1950 – 1970

Politics of Rotherham
Parliamentary constituencies in Yorkshire and the Humber
Constituencies of the Parliament of the United Kingdom established in 1885